Chui is a surname.

Origins
Chui is a spelling of the Cantonese pronunciation of two Chinese surnames, listed below by their Pinyin transcription (which reflects the Mandarin pronunciation):

 Cuī, which originated as a toponymic surname from a fief by that name in the state of Qi; a grandson of Jiang Ziya renounced his claim to the throne and went to live in that fief, and his descendants took its name as their surname. (Cantonese pronunciation – )
 Xú, which originated as a toponymic surname from the ancient state of Xu, adopted by the descendants of Boyi after the state was annexed by the state of Chu. (Cantonese pronunciation – ).

Statistics
According to statistics cited by Patrick Hanks, there were 267 people on the island of Great Britain and 12 on the island of Ireland with the surname Chui as of 2011. There had been one person with that surname in Great Britain in 1881.

The 2010 United States Census found 1,420 people with the surname Chui, making it the 19,138th-most-common name in the country. This represented an increase from 1,303 (19,248th-most-common) in the 2000 Census. In both censuses, more than nine-tenths of the bearers of the surname identified as Asian, and roughly two percent as White.

People

Surname 崔
Chui Sai Cheong (born 1954), Macau politician, older brother of Fernando Chui
Fernando Chui (born 1957), second chief executive of Macau
Anita Chui (born 1988), Hong Kong actress
Vincent Chui, Hong Kong film director

Surname 徐
Chui A-poo (died 1851), Chinese pirate 
Norman Chui (born 1950), Hong Kong actor
Alan Chui Chung-San (born 1954), Hong Kong actor
Chui Chi-kin (born 1967), Hong Kong politician
Chui Tien-you (born 1983), Hong Kong actor

Other or unknown
Nelson Oswaldo Chui Mejía (born 1947), Peruvian politician
Mathieu Ngudjolo Chui (born 1970), Congolese army colonel

See also
Hui (surname), the Cantonese spelling of another surname transcribed as Xǔ in Pinyin

References

Chinese-language surnames
Multiple Chinese surnames